Maxwell Dube (born 30 November 1976) is a retired Zimbabwean football striker.

References

1976 births
Living people
Zimbabwean footballers
Zimbabwe international footballers
Chapungu United F.C. players
Hellenic F.C. players
Dynamos F.C. players
Association football forwards
Zimbabwean expatriate footballers
Expatriate soccer players in South Africa
Zimbabwean expatriate sportspeople in South Africa